Cheongnyangsan is a mountain of Gyeongsangbuk-do, eastern South Korea. It has an elevation of 870 metres.

See also
List of mountains of Korea

References

Bonghwa County
Andong
Mountains of North Gyeongsang Province
Mountains of South Korea
Taebaek Mountains